Ngilgi Cave, previously known as Yallingup Cave, is a karst cave to the northeast of Yallingup, in the southwest of Western Australia. 

In many sections of the cave a red layer of soil can be seen; this is called paleosol.

Discovery 
The local Wardandi  people have long known of the existence of the Ngilgi cave. The Wardandi believe the caves to be their passage to the afterlife.

Edward Dawson was the first European to enter the cave when he went searching for stray horses in 1899. He acted as a guide to the cave from December 1900 to November 1937.

It was frequently promoted and was highlighted in early twentieth century tourism promotion materials.

Naming
It was originally named for the nearby town of Yallingup but later renamed to acknowledge the cave's part in Australian Aboriginal mythology. Ngilgi (pronounced Neelgee) was a good spirit who triumphed in battle against an evil spirit Wolgine.

The story is part of the heritage of the Wardandi people who are the custodians of the caves in the area.

See also
 Niggly Cave, Tasmania
 List of caves in Australia
 List of caves in Western Australia

Gallery

Notes

External links
Ngilgi Cave Tourism Western Australia

Show caves in Australia
Leeuwin-Naturaliste National Park
Caves of Western Australia